Jean Porporato, originally named Giovanni Giacomo Bernardo Porporato (3 November 1879 – ?), was an Italian-born French automobile racing driver and mechanic from Turin who later lived much of his life Lyon, Rhône.

He is mentioned in automobile press articles from 28 January 1906, where he is listed as a mechanic of the racing driver Paul Bablot on the occasion of the endurance record  in a Berliet  car on the route from Salon to Arles.

Paul Bablot (1873–1932), the Berliet agent at Marseille, was the named driver for the Berliet marque in competition from 1904 (Mont Ventoux race, France) until 1906 with the Targa Florio and the Tourist Trophy, and one more time in 1908 with a victory in the Boulevard Michelet Hillclimb of Marseille.

Porporato, as fine-tuner and driver, drove Berliet cars in competition from 1907 until 1911. In the 1907 season he raced in the Targa Florio race, from which he retired. In the 1908 season he reached fourth place in the Targa Florio and competed in the Targa Bologna, achieving his only victory in the Berliet. In 1911 he appeared in the Coup de Voiturettes. In this race he came fifth in the 1913 season and ninth in the 1914 season.

Porporato also competed in the Indianapolis 500 of 1915 and 1920, on both occasions failing to finish. In 1923 and 1924, he drove La Buire cars, notably at the French Grand Prix in Lyon in 1924.  In his last, and most important, race, the 1925 24 Hours of Le Mans, he retired.

Indy 500 results

References

External links

 Racing career at racing-database.com (Retrieved 26 July 2010)

French racing drivers
Indianapolis 500 drivers
Year of death missing
24 Hours of Le Mans drivers
Year of birth missing